Dasari Subrahmanyam, is a Telugu writer who is known for his serialized fantastic adventure stories published in Chandamama children's magazine. His stories basically featured fantasies based in backdrop of ancient and/or medieval India, as apparent from the place names appearing in the stories.

Literary works
12 Classic serials of Chandamama have been created by Shri D. Subrahmanyam. These include:

 The Comet (Hindi: Dhumketu, Telugu:Toka chukka)
 Crocodile Lord (Hindi: Makar Devta, Telugu:Makara Devatha)
 Three Wizards (Hindi: Teen Mantrik, Telugu:Mugguru Mantrikulu)
 The Bronze Castle (Hindi: Qila, Telugu:Kanchu Kota)
 Fire Island (Hindi: Agni Dweep, Telugu:Jwalaa Deepam)
 The Monster Valley (Hindi: Bhayankar Ghati, Telugu:Rakaasi Loya)
 The Underworld Fort (Hindi: Patal Qila, Telugu:Paatala Durgam)
 Temple in Ruins (Sithilaalayam)
 The Yaksha Mountain (Hindi: Yaksha Parvat, Telugu:Yaksha Parvatham)
 The Chariot (Raathi Ratham)
 The Enchanted Pond (Hindi: Maya Sarovar, Telugu:Maya Sarovaram)
 The Bear Wizard (Hindi: Bhalluk Mantrik, Telugu:Bhalluuka Mantrikudu)

Life
D. Subrahmanyam worked with the Chandamama for more than 50 years and retired in 2006.

The 'Prasthanam' monthly Telugu magazine has published an article on D. Subrhamanyam in its September 2008 issue.

External links
 Chandamama: The Beginning

Indian comics writers
1932 births
Living people
Writers from Andhra Pradesh
Indian children's book illustrators
Telugu writers